The Unalaska collared lemming (Dicrostonyx unalascensis) is a species of rodent in the family Cricetidae.
This species is found on two islands, Umnak and Unalaska, in the Aleutian Archipelago of Alaska in the United States.
Its natural habitat is tundra.

References

Musser, G. G. and M. D. Carleton. (2005). Superfamily Muroidea. pp. 894–1531 in Mammal Species of the World a Taxonomic and Geographic Reference. D. E. Wilson and D. M. Reeder eds. Johns Hopkins University Press, Baltimore.

Dicrostonyx
Fauna of Alaska
Endemic fauna of the United States
Endemic fauna of Alaska
Umnak
Unalaska Island
Mammals described in 1900
Taxonomy articles created by Polbot
Taxa named by Clinton Hart Merriam